Lechenaultia brevifolia  is a species of flowering plant in the family Goodeniaceae and is endemic to inland south-western Western Australia. It is a tufted, sparsely-branched subshrub with crowded, narrow, fleshy leaves and white and blue, tube-shaped flowers.

Description

Taxonomy
Lechenaultia brevifolia was first formally described in 1987 by David A. Morrison in the journal Brunonia from specimens collected by Richard Helms in 1891. The specific epithet (brevifolia) means "short-leaved".

Distribution and habitat
Lechenaultia brevifolia grows in low heath and scrub between Southern Cross and the Cape Arid National Park in the Avon Wheatbelt, Coolgardie, Great Victoria Desert and Mallee biogeographic regions of inland, south-western Western Australia.

References

brevifolia
Garden plants of Australia
Plants described in 1987